"Man on the Moon" is a song by American alternative rock band R.E.M., released in November 1992 as the second single from their eighth album, Automatic for the People (1992). The lyric was written by lead singer Michael Stipe, and the music by drummer Bill Berry and guitarist Peter Buck, and the track is credited to the whole band as usual. The song was well received by critics and reached number 30 on the US Billboard Hot 100 number 17 on the US Cash Box Top 100, number 18 on the UK Singles Chart and number one in Iceland. It remains one of R.E.M.'s most popular songs and was included on the compilations In Time: The Best of R.E.M. 1988–2003 and Part Lies, Part Heart, Part Truth, Part Garbage 1982–2011.

Lyrically, the song is a tribute to the comedian and performer Andy Kaufman, with numerous references to his career, including his Elvis impersonation, wrestling, and the film My Breakfast with Blassie. The song's title and chorus refer to the Moon landing conspiracy theories, as an oblique allusion to rumors that Kaufman's death in 1984 was faked. The song gave its name to Miloš Forman's comedy-drama film Man on the Moon (1999), starring Jim Carrey and based on Kaufman's life, and features prominently in the film's soundtrack.

Composition
"Man on the Moon" is a mid-tempo country-rock song following a verse-chorus structure with an added pre-chorus and an instrumental bridge following the second and third choruses. The song has six lines in the first verse but only four in the second and third verses.

An early instrumental demo of the song was known to the band as "C to D Slide". Guitarist Peter Buck has explained how the music came together: "'Man on the Moon' was something that Bill [Berry] had, this one chord change that he came in with, which was C to D like the verse of the song, and he said: 'I don't know what to do with that.' I used to finish some of Bill's things ... he would come up with the riffs, but I would be the finish guy for that. I sat down and came up with the chorus, the bridges, and so forth. I remember we showed it to Mike and Michael when they came in later; definitely we had the song finished. I think Bill played bass and I played guitar; we kept going around with it. I think we might have played some mandolin on it in the rehearsal studio."

Michael Stipe explained in an interview with Charlie Rose how the lyric was written independently of the music, which had no prior association with the song's eventual lyrical content regarding Kaufman. Stipe recounted the other R.E.M. members had written and performed the music of the song and recorded it along with the rest of the Automatic for the People album during studio sessions in Seattle. As of the final week of the recording sessions, Stipe was still struggling to write the lyric, and the others continued to plead with him to finish it. Stipe attempted to argue the track should be an instrumental, but his bandmates were insistent. Stipe listened to the track on a walk around Seattle on his Walkman cassette player and was inspired to write about the performances of entertainer Andy Kaufman. After Stipe went back to the studio to complete the vocal track, the master was mixed that night and sent out the following day to be mastered.

Lyric
The song's lyric does not tell a conventional story and may instead be seen as a collection of cultural references, images and ideas. There are repeated mentions of Andy Kaufman, including references to his Elvis impersonation and work with wrestlers Fred Blassie and Jerry Lawler. Some critics find the song also invokes the conspiracy theories surrounding the Moon landing and Elvis Presley as an indirect nod to the persistent rumors that Kaufman faked his own death. Speaking in 2017 to the NME, Mike Mills explained that the perceived ambiguity of Kaufman's legacy, including questions of whether he was a comedian or a performance artist, and whether his work was funny or irritating, was a way to frame other questions about life within the song:

He's the perfect ghost to lead you through this tour of questioning things. Did the moon landing really happen? Is Elvis really dead? He was kind of an ephemeral figure at that point so he was the perfect guy to tie all this stuff together as you journey through childhood and touchstones of life.

Regarding the cryptic lyric, critic Greg Kot wrote that the song "presents a surreal vision of heaven." According to Ann Powers, "Mentioning Kaufman in the same breath as Moses and Sir Isaac Newton, Stipe makes a game of human endeavor, insisting that it all ends in dust. 'Let's play Twister, let's play Risk,' Stipe jokes to the notables he's invoked. 'I'll see you in heaven if you make the list.'"

The lyric to "Man on the Moon" also features a prominent  refrain of "Yeah, yeah yeah, yeah, yeah". Stipe explained  Kurt Cobain was in the habit of placing 'yeah' in the lyrics of his band Nirvana, and that Stipe intended to outdo him, even to the extent of counting the 'yeah's.

Release and reception
"Man on the Moon" was released as the second single from Automatic for the People on November 9, 1992, reaching number 30 on the Billboard Hot 100 and number 18 on the UK Singles Chart. 

The song was enthusiastically received by critics. Writing for the New York Times, Ann Powers said it "shines with a wit that balances R.E.M.'s somber tendencies." Stewart Mason went even further in his review for AllMusic, calling the song "near-perfect", "almost inarguably Stipe's pinnacle as a singer", and "one of R.E.M.'s most enduring achievements". In his weekly UK chart commentary, James Masterton felt that it "may be typical R.E.M. but is not their most commercial ever. The wave of following they have at the moment though means they can do little wrong with this possibly following 'Drive' into the Top 10." Parry Gettelman from Orlando Sentinel wrote, "The gently catchy "Man on the Moon" sounds a bit more like Lifes Rich Pageant-era R.E.M. although the arrangement is more acoustic. Mills' high harmonies, all too rare on this album, add resonance, and as Michael Stipe sings about Andy Kaufman, the Twister game and Elvis, he lapses into a humorous, appealing Elvis-via-Bryan-Ferry imitation. Peter Buck's slide guitar underlines the hummable chorus. The melody sounds a whole lot like a lower-key remake of "Fall on Me", but that was such a great song, who's complaining?" The song was listed at number 19 on the Village Voice "Pazz & Jop" year-end critics' poll in 1993.

Music video
The song's accompanying music video, directed by Peter Care, was shot over three days in the desert, at Lancaster in the Antelope Valley area of California, in October 1992. Care kept a journal of the unusually long planning, filming, and editing process, which was published by Raygun magazine and reprinted in the R.E.M. fan club newsletter. It gave a clear idea of the amount of work, money, and attention-to-detail involved.

The video depicts Michael Stipe, attired in a cowboy hat, walking along a desert road before leaping onto a passing truck (driven by Bill Berry) and hitching a ride to a truck stop, where Peter Buck is tending bar and Mike Mills is shooting pool. Berry trades his truck seat for a bar stool, and along with a few of the other customers sings along during the choruses. Stipe eats an order of fries and then leaves and walks back into the desert. The video is punctuated with Moon-related images, including footage of the NASA Moon landings, an orrery in motion and a clip from Georges Méliès' 1902 film A Trip to the Moon. Television footage of Kaufman wrestling and impersonating Elvis Presley is also shown.

This video, which uses the shorter version instead of the full album version, was ranked number 41 on Rolling Stone magazine's The 100 Top Music Videos and has been described as 'iconic' by the NME Andrew Trendell.

Track listings
All songs were written by Bill Berry, Peter Buck, Mike Mills and Michael Stipe except as noted.

US 7-inch, cassette, and CD single
 "Man on the Moon" (album version) – 5:12
 "New Orleans Instrumental No. 2" – 3:47

UK CD1
 "Man on the Moon" (edit) – 4:39
 "Turn You Inside-Out" – 4:15
 "Arms of Love"  – 3:35

UK CD2
 "Man on the Moon" – 5:12
 "Fruity Organ" – 3:26
 "New Orleans Instrumental No. 2" – 3:48
 "Arms of Love"  – 3:35

UK 7-inch and cassette single
 "Man on the Moon" (edit) – 4:39
 "Turn You Inside-Out" – 4:15

Charts

Weekly charts

Year-end charts

Certifications

References

1992 songs
1992 singles
R.E.M. songs
Songs written by Bill Berry
Songs written by Peter Buck
Songs written by Mike Mills
Songs written by Michael Stipe
Warner Records singles
Rock ballads
Country ballads
Songs based on actual events
Song recordings produced by Scott Litt
Song recordings produced by Michael Stipe
Song recordings produced by Mike Mills
Song recordings produced by Peter Buck
Song recordings produced by Bill Berry
Commemoration songs
Cultural depictions of Andy Kaufman
Songs about the Moon
Black-and-white music videos
Country rock songs
Number-one singles in Iceland